Stadionul Orășenesc is a multi-purpose stadium in Făurei, Romania. It is currently used mostly for football matches, is the home ground of CS Făurei and holds 1,000 people.

References

External links
Stadionul Orășenesc (Făurei) at soccerway.com

Football venues in Romania
Sport in Brăila County
Buildings and structures in Brăila County